24UR (24 hours) is a daily news show on the Slovenian commercial television POP TV, which airs every day at 7 PM. During workdays, the show also has an afternoon edition - 24UR POPOLDNE (at 5 PM) - and an evening edition - 24UR ZVEČER (at around 10 PM).

Awards and nominations 
 Professional viktor for the best news TV show (years 2004, 2005, 2006, 2007, 2008)
 Nomination for a professional viktor for the best news TV show (years 1997, 1998, 1999, 2000, 2001, 2002, 2003, 2009, 2010, 2011)
 Popularity viktor for the best TV show (2012)

References 

Pop (Slovenian TV channel) original programming
Television news shows
Slovenian television shows